The 1996–97 Long Island Blackbirds men's basketball team represented Long Island University during the 1996–97 NCAA Division I men's basketball season. The Blackbirds, led by 2nd year head coach Ray Haskins, played their home games at the Athletic, Recreation & Wellness Center and were members of the Northeast Conference. They finished the season 21–9, 15–3 in NEC play to capture the regular season championship. They also won the NEC tournament to earn an automatic bid in the 1997 NCAA tournament where they lost in the opening round to Villanova.

Roster

Schedule and results
 
|-
!colspan=9 style=| Regular season

|-
!colspan=9 style=| Northeast Conference tournament

|-
!colspan=9 style=| NCAA tournament

,

References

Long Island
Long Island
LIU Brooklyn Blackbirds men's basketball seasons
Long Island Blackbirds men's b
Long Island Blackbirds men's b